Right Now is the title of a number-one R&B single by singer/actor Al B. Sure!. The hit song spent one week at number-one on the US R&B chart and peaked at number forty-seven on the Billboard Hot 100.

References

See also
List of number-one R&B singles of 1992 (U.S.)

1992 singles
Songs written by Al B. Sure!
1992 songs
Al B. Sure! songs